KSKB is a Christian radio station licensed to Brooklyn, Iowa, broadcasting on 99.1 MHz FM.  KSKB serves East Central Iowa including; Cedar Rapids, Iowa City, Marshalltown, Pella, Newton and Oskaloosa. The station is owned by Florida Public Radio, Inc. The station began broadcasting March 1, 1988, and originally broadcast at 99.3 MHz.

Translators
KSKB is also heard in Waterloo, Iowa through a translator on 99.7 FM.

References

External links
KSKB's official website

SKB
Radio stations established in 1988
1988 establishments in Iowa